Sea Point can refer to:

 Sea Point, Cape Town, Cape Town
 Sea Point High School
 Seapoint, Blackrock and Monkstown in Dublin, Ireland
 Seapoint railway station
 Sea Point (album)